Tudor Florian (born 1900, date of death unknown) was a Romanian footballer who played as a defender.

International career
Tudor Florian played one friendly match for Romania, on 26 October 1923 under coach Constantin Rădulescu in a 2–2 against Turkey.

References

External links
 

1900 births
Year of death missing
Romanian footballers
Romania international footballers
Place of birth missing
Association football defenders
Liga I players
Venus București players